Hans Jürgen Fritz is a former international speedway rider from East Germany.

Speedway career 
Fritz reached the final of the Speedway World Championship in the 1970 Individual Speedway World Championship.

He was three times champion of East Germany after winning the German Individual Speedway Championship in 1970, 1971 and 1972.

World final appearances

Individual World Championship
 1970 –  Wrocław, Olympic Stadium – 12th – 5pts

Individual Ice Speedway World Championship
1967 -  3 rounds, 13th - 10pts
1968 -  2 rounds, 6th - 35pts

References 

German speedway riders
Possibly living people
Year of birth missing